Elizabeth Avery Eggert (1848–1935) was a homeopathic physician, businesswoman and an activist who helped women in Oregon obtain the right to vote. She contributed to the nationwide reform of public health, philanthropy and suffrage for women during the end of the 19th and beginning of the 20th centuries.

Early life and education 
Born Elizabeth Avery in 1848 in Oxfordshire, England, Eggert moved to the United States in 1853 with her family, where they settled in Connecticut. Eggert studied at the Ipswich Female Seminary in Massachusetts. By the end of the 1860s she graduated from the Homeopathic Hospital College for Women, in Cleveland, Ohio.

Career
She moved to Lawrence, Kansas where Eggert opened her own homeopathic medicine medical practice. She became the first woman in Kansas to be admitted to any medical society in that state when she joined the Kansas Homeopathic Medical Society in 1872.

The following year after joining the Medical Society, she married Frederick Eggert (May 30, 1843 – April 26, 1918.) Frederick hailed from Milwaukee, Wisconsin. In 1876 the two arrived in Albany, Oregon, where Frederick supported them working in dry goods. In 1882 Frederick and Elizabeth moved again, to Portland, Oregon, where the couple opened a shoe store called Eggert, Young & Company. The business grew throughout the Pacific Northwest, opening several branches. Frederick continued to manage the home store in Portland until 1918, when he died at the age of 75. Elizabeth continued as the vice president of Eggert-Young Company in Portland.

Suffragist 
Elizabeth was active for about 25 years in the movement to secure voting rights for women in Oregon. She was the president of the Portland Woman's Club in 1912, during the club's last year campaigning for the vote, which was granted in Oregon in November of that year. As a member of the club's Suffrage Campaign Committee and an organizer and speaker on the movement's behalf, she likely played a key role in the success of the campaign.

References

1848 births
1935 deaths
American suffragists
Progressive Era in the United States
Activists from Portland, Oregon
American homeopaths